"The Loving Gift" is a song written by Kris Kristofferson and originally recorded by the duo of Johnny Cash and June Carter Cash.

Released in December 1972 as a single (Columbia 4-45758, with a cover of Kristofferson's "Help Me Make It Through the Night" on the opposite side) and also included on Johnny Cash's album Any Old Wind That Blows out on January 5 of the next year, the song reached number 27 on U.S. Billboard country chart for the week of March 10, 1973.

Track listing

Charts

References

External links 
 "The Loving Gift" on the Johnny Cash official website

Johnny Cash songs
June Carter Cash songs
Songs written by Kris Kristofferson
1972 songs
1972 singles
Columbia Records singles